A skate contest or skateboarding contest or skateboarding competition is a competition between people skateboarding, usually on a designated course or ramp, typically decided by judges' scoring.

History 
The first skate contest took place in 1973 in Hermosa Beach, California, sponsored by Makaha and held at the Pier Avenue Junior High School.

In April 26 & 27, 1975, The Zephyr Boys impress the crowd at the Bahne-Cadillac National Championships held as part of the Del Mar Ocean Festival. Coverage from this skate contest propelled the Z-Boys as first skate celebrities. The unique and aggressive style of the Z-Boys caused a major sensation and controversy at the competition.

In 1982, Tony Hawk won his first skateboard contest at the Del Mar Skate Ranch. In 1983, Tommy Guerrero won the first street-style skateboard contest at Golden Gate Park, in San Francisco.

The first Tampa Pro competition took place in 1995 and was won by Mike Vallely. The first X Games contest took place in 1995. The first Street League Skateboarding contest took place in 2010. Skateboarding made its debut as an Olympic sport at the 2021 Summer Olympics.

Photos of skate contests

References 

Skateboarding
Skateboarding competitions